Gail Johnson (born 16 November 1964) is a Canadian sailor. She competed in the women's 470 event at the 1988 Summer Olympics.

References

External links
 

1964 births
Living people
Canadian female sailors (sport)
Olympic sailors of Canada
Sailors at the 1988 Summer Olympics – 470
Sportspeople from Montreal